John Singer Sargent was an American artist, considered the "leading portrait painter of his generation" for his evocations of Edwardian era luxury. During his career, he created roughly 900 oil paintings and more than 2,000 watercolors, as well as countless sketches and charcoal drawings. His oeuvre documents worldwide travel, from Venice to the Tyrol, Corfu, the Middle East, Montana, Maine, and Florida.

From the beginning his work was characterized by remarkable technical facility, particularly in his ability to draw with a brush, which in later years inspired admiration as well as criticism for a supposed superficiality. His commissioned works were consistent with the grand manner of portraiture, while his informal studies and landscape paintings displayed a familiarity with Impressionism.

In later life Sargent expressed ambivalence about the restrictions of formal portrait work, and devoted much of his energy to mural painting and working en plein air.

Works

References

Bibliography

External links

Works by American people

Sargent